The .33-40 Pope is a wildcat cartridge designed around 1900 by Harry Pope, a noted rifleman.  The cartridge is a necked up .32-40 Ballard.  It was Pope's favorite wildcat, and was often used with great success by him.

Pistol and rifle cartridges
Wildcat cartridges